Quaternium may refer to:

 Polyquaternium
 Quaternium-15
 quaternary ammonium, functional group, cation, salt, compound

See also